Government School, Bidhwan is a government funded school located in Bidhwan village of Siwani tehsil of Bhiwani district in the Indian state of Haryana. Established in 1970, this is a prominent school of the area for being one of the earliest known school of the district for the rural education.

History
A government co-educational primary school existed since 1970, which was progressively upgraded to middle and then to high secondary school.

The school also operates Anganwadi.

Academics
The schools offer classes till 10th.

See also 

 Govt. Girls School, Kanwari
 Govt. School, Kanwari
 List of schools in Hisar
 Government College, Nalwa
 List of Universities and Colleges in Hisar
 List of institutions of higher education in Haryana
 Haryana Board of School Education
 Engineering colleges in Haryana
 Rajiv Gandhi Education City, Sonipat
 List of universities in India
 Department of Elementary Education, Haryana Official website
 Director Secondary Education, Haryana
 Department of Higher Education, Haryana Official website
 Department of School Education, Haryana Official website

External links

References 

Schools in Bhiwani